Three is a 2020 crime drama film directed by Ruslan Pak. It is based on the true story of Nikolai Dzhumagaliev. The film starring Askar Ilyasov, Igor Savochkin and Samal Yeslyamova. It was released theatrically on 21 April 2022.

Cast
 Askar Ilyasov as Sher Sadikhov
 Igor Savochkin as Oleg Snegirev
 Samal Yeslyamova as Dina Sadikhov
 Nurzhan Sadybekov as Daniyar
 Zhandos Aibassov as Alik Korazhanov
 Tolganay Talgat as Alina

Reception

Accolades

References

External links
 

2020 crime drama films
2020s serial killer films
Kazakh-language films
Kazakhstani crime drama films
South Korean crime drama films
South Korean police films
South Korean serial killer films
Police detective films
Films about cannibalism
Films about real serial killers
Films set in 1979
Films set in Kazakhstan
Films set in the Soviet Union
Films shot in Kazakhstan
Crime films based on actual events
Drama films based on actual events